Eccopsis wahlbergiana is a moth of the family Tortricidae. It is found throughout of subtropical Africa, from Sénégal to South Africa, including the islands of Comoros, Cape Verde and Madagascar.

Known host plants of the larvae are Euphorbiaceae (Ricinus sp. and Ricinus communis).

References
Zeller 1852a. Lepidoptera Microptera, quae J. A. Wahlberg in Caffrorum terra collegit. - — :1–120.

External links
westafricanlepidoptera.com: Pictures of Eccopsis wahlbergiana

Moths described in 1852
Olethreutini
Moths of Africa
Moths of Cape Verde
Moths of the Comoros
Moths of Madagascar